The LXXI Army Corps, initially known as Higher Command LXXI or Höh.Kdo. röm. 71, was an army corps of the German Wehrmacht during World War II. The corps was deployed in March 1942. Throughout the war, it was stationed in the north of occupied Norway.

History 
The Höheres Kommando LXXI was formed on 1 March 1942 using the personnel of Section Staff North Norway, which had in turn been formed on 1 July 1941 from the territorial staff of Mountain Corps Norway. The initial commander of Higher Command LXXI was Emmerich Nagy. The corps initially consisted of the 199th Infantry Division and the 702nd Infantry Division and was subordinate to Armee Norwegen (Nikolaus von Falkenhorst). The corps was strengthened by the 230th Infantry Division and the 270th Infantry Division in May 1942, and the 702nd Infantry Division was pulled away by June.

The subsequent corps structure, including the 199th, 230th and 270th Divisions, stayed unchanged between June 1942 and November 1944.

Nagy was succeeded by Willi Moser on 1 November 1942.

On 26 January 1943, the Higher Command LXXI was renamed LXXI Army Corps, with Moser still in command.

In November 1944, the Armee Norwegen was dissolved and its tasks taken over by the 20th Mountain Army (Lothar Rendulic, Franz Böhme). The 230th Infantry Division was pulled away from the corps in November. Moser was succeeded as corps commander by Anton Reichard von Mauchenheim genannt Bechtolsheim on 15 December 1944. In December 1944, the 163rd Infantry Division and 210th Infantry Division were added to the corps, while the 270th Division was pulled away.

Starting in February 1945, the LXXI Army Corps was part of Army Detachment Narvik (Ferdinand Jodl), where it remained until the end of the war. By February, the 163rd and 210th Divisions had been pulled away from the corps and the 7th Mountain Division had been added. The Division zbV 140 was added to the corps by 1 March.

On 12 April 1945, the last day for which military organizational charts are available, the corps consisted of the 140th, 210th and the 230th Divisions.

Structure

Noteworthy individuals 

 Emmerich Nagy, corps commander of Higher Command LXXI (15 March 1942 – 1 November 1942).
 Willi Moser, corps commander of Higher Command LXXI and LXXI Army Corps (1 November 1942 – 15 December 1944).
 Anton Reichard von Mauchenheim, corps commander of LXXI Army Corps (15 December 1944 – May 1945).

Notes

References 

Corps of Germany in World War II
Military units and formations established in 1942
Military units and formations disestablished in 1945